Nirontor (in English as Forever Flows) is a 2006 Bangladeshi drama film directed by Abu Sayeed. It stars Dolly Johur, Jayanta Chattopadhyay, Amirul Haque Chowdhury, Litu Anam and Shilpi Sarkar Apu. It was Bangladesh's submission to the 79th Academy Awards for the Academy Award for Best Foreign Language Film, but was not accepted as a nominee.

Plot
Nirontor (Forever Flows) portrays the struggle of Thithi, a young girl who comes from a lower-middle-class family. Tithi takes up the job of a call girl to support her family. In time, the economic condition of the family changes, but slowly Tithi becomes very much aloof and indifferent to everything. She takes refuge in solitude.

Cast
 Shabnur as Tithi
 Litu Anam as Hiru
 Shilpi Sharkar Apu as Farida
 Dolly Johur as Mother
 Jayanta Chattopadhyay as Nasim
 Amirul Huq Chawdhury as Father
 Shahidul Islam Sachchu
 Ilias Kanchan

Award
 Special Jury Award, International Film Festival of India, Goa, 2006
 Best Film, International Film Festival Kerala, 2006
 Best Film by FIPRESCI, International Film Festival of Kerala, 2006
 Bangladesh Submission for OSCAR, 2006

Festival participations 
 Official selection, Rotterdam International film Festival
 Official selection, Palm Spring International Film Festival
 Official selection, Kolkata International Film Festival
 Official selection, Bangalore international film festival
 Official selection, Pune International Film Festival

See also

Cinema of Bangladesh
List of submissions to the 79th Academy Awards for Best Foreign Language Film

References

External links
 
 Nirontor from BMDB

2006 films
2006 drama films
Bengali-language Bangladeshi films
Bangladeshi drama films
2000s Bengali-language films
Films scored by S I Tutul
Films directed by Abu Sayeed (film director)
Impress Telefilm films